Yerrinbool railway station is located on the Main South line in New South Wales, Australia. It serves the town of Yerrinbool, opening on 13 July 1919 at the same time as a new alignment between Picton and Mittagong. In March 1991, the weatherboard building on Platform 1 was demolished.

Platforms & services
Yerrinbool has two side platforms. It is serviced by NSW TrainLink Southern Highlands Line services travelling between Campbelltown and Moss Vale with 2 weekend morning services to Sydney Central and limited evening services to Goulburn.

Transport links
Berrima Buslines operate one route that serves Yerrinbool station:
806: Mittagong to Bargo

References

External links

Yerrinbool station details Transport for New South Wales

Railway stations in Australia opened in 1919
Regional railway stations in New South Wales
Short-platform railway stations in New South Wales, 2 cars
Main Southern railway line, New South Wales
Wingecarribee Shire